Achaguas is a small town in Apure State in Venezuela, in the Achaguas Municipality.

Achaguas was founded in 1774 by Fray Alonso de Castro, and its name was taken from the native tribe The Achaguas. Formerly, it was called "Santa Bárbara de la Isla de los Achaguas". Since 1835, the miraculous wood-carved figure of "El Nazareno de Achaguas is venerated in its church ". This figure was a donation that General José Antonio Páez gave to the town in agreement to the victory obtained in the battle against the Spanish for the independence of Venezuela which were to take place in Carabobo (1821).

References

Populated places in Apure
Populated places established in 1774